Shanakiyan Ragul Rajaputhiran Rasamanickam (born 20 September 1990) is a Sri Lankan Tamil politician and Member of Parliament.

Rasamanickam was born on 20 September 1990. He is the grandson of former MP S. M. Rasamanickam. He was educated at Trinity College, Kandy. He was the Sri Lanka Freedom Party's organiser in Paddiruppu. He was an associate of the Rajapaksa regime and extremist Buddhist monk Sumanarathna, and a supporter of paramilitary leader Pillayan. He is currently a member of Illankai Tamil Arasu Kachchi.

Rasamanickam contested the 2015 parliamentary election as one of the United People's Freedom Alliance (UPFA) electoral alliance's candidates in Batticaloa District but the alliance failed to win any seats in the district. He contested the 2020 parliamentary election as a Tamil National Alliance electoral alliance candidate in Batticaloa District and was elected to the Parliament of Sri Lanka.

References

1990 births
Alumni of Trinity College, Kandy
Living people
Members of the 16th Parliament of Sri Lanka
Illankai Tamil Arasu Kachchi politicians
Sri Lanka Freedom Party politicians
Sri Lankan Christians
Sri Lankan Tamil politicians
Tamil National Alliance politicians
United People's Freedom Alliance politicians